Taylor Township is located in Ogle County, Illinois. As of the 2010 census, its population was 963 and it contained 488 housing units. A referendum to merge Taylor Township with neighboring LaFayette Township failed when Taylor voted against the referendum. The referendum was approved in LaFayette.

Geography

Demographics

References

External links 
City-data.com
Ogle County Official Site
Illinois State Archives

Townships in Ogle County, Illinois
Populated places established in 1849
Townships in Illinois
1849 establishments in Illinois